Logan Charles Panchot (born July 8, 1998) is a former American soccer player. He is now the founder of Clear Contracts, an early stage start up that specializes in making an easy way for businesses to adopt blockchain technology.

Career

Youth, College & Amateur
Panchot was born in Napa, California, but grew up in St. Louis, Missouri. Here he was part of the St. Louis Scott Gallagher academy for over 10 years. In 2017, Panchot went to play college soccer at Stanford University. Here he made 62 appearances, scoring 3 goals and tallying 11 assists over 3 seasons with the Cardinal. The 2020 season was cancelled due to the COVID-19 pandemic. Whilst at Stanford, Panchot was NCAA champion in 2017, a two-time Pac-12 champion, a two-time All-Pac-12, and was on the Pac-12 Academic Honor Roll.

In 2019, Panchot also played in the USL League Two with San Francisco City.

Professional
On January 21, 2021, Panchot was selected 32nd overall in the 2021 MLS SuperDraft by D.C. United. On April 30, 2021, he signed with D.C. United's USL Championship side Loudoun United. He made his professional debut on May 2, 2021, starting against Miami FC. He scored his first goal for Loudoun on June 2, 2021, in a 2–3 loss against the Pittsburgh Riverhounds.

On July 19, 2021, Panchot was released from Loudoun United "to pursue non-soccer opportunities".

Personal
Logan's brother Austin, is also a professional soccer player.

References

External links 
 Stanford Cardinal Profile

1998 births
Living people
American soccer players
Association football defenders
D.C. United draft picks
Loudoun United FC players
People from St. Louis
San Francisco City FC players
Soccer players from St. Louis
Stanford Cardinal men's soccer players
United States men's youth international soccer players
USL Championship players
USL League Two players